Lucas Brentley Adams (born July 24, 1993) is an American actor. He is known for his appearances in True Blood and a recurring role on Disney's Liv and Maddie. Adams joined the cast of Days of Our Lives in 2017. He was nominated for the Daytime Emmy Award for Outstanding Younger Actor in a Drama Series in 2018 and 2019 for his work on the series.

Early life
Adams was born on July 24, 1993 in Sherman, Texas to Brent and Shari Adams. The family relocated to Bells, Texas when Lucas was only two years old. Both of his parents were college athletes. Adams has two older sisters, Audrie and Brittnie. He grew up with aspirations of being a professional athlete or an actor. He earned all district honors for football, basketball and baseball in high school and was recruited out of high school for baseball. Adams planned in college, on the condition that received a full-scholarship, otherwise, he would try his hand at acting. When school didn't offer what he wanted, Adams got his parents blessing to pursue acting and relocated to Los Angeles where his sister Brittnie resided. Adams said it was a culture shock in comparison to his small town with one stop light and no crosswalks. He drove a big U-Haul truck for his sister's job which he admits helped him get accustomed to the road.

Career
About three months after he moved to Los Angeles, Adams landed a commercial for Toyota Tundra which helped him pay bills for a while. His first speaking role was an episode of CBS's The Young and the Restless in 2012. Adams then went on to appear in episodes of Dexter, Grimm, School of Rock and Recovery Road. In 2014, Adams appeared as Lou in the final season of the HBO supernatural drama, True Blood. In 2015, he began appearing the recurring role of Josh Wilcox on the Disney Channel sitcom, Liv and Maddie. In late 2016, Adams joined the cast of Days of Our Lives as Tripp Dalton.

Adams left the series in August 2019. He was then cast opposite Days co-star Paige Searcy in the television film, Kidnapped by a Classmate which premiered in January 2020. In February 2020, Adams was reportedly cast in latest installment of the American Pie film series, American Pie Presents: Girls' Rules. Adams returned to Days of Our Lives on September 4, 2020.

Personal life
While working on Liv and Maddie in October 2015, Adams met his girlfriend, Shelby Wulfert. The couple became engaged in July 2021. They were married on October 15, 2022 at the Chateau Hiddenwood estate in Waxahachie, Texas.

He has a dog called Lando Auditore named for Lando Calrissian from Star Wars and Ezio Auditore da Firenze from the video game Assassin's Creed.

Filmography

Awards and nominations

References

External links
 

1993 births
21st-century American male actors
Living people
People from Sherman, Texas
Male actors from Texas
American male television actors
American male soap opera actors